Itapeva may refer to the following places in Brazil:

Itapeva, Minas Gerais
Itapeva, São Paulo